Joseph Fisher or Joe Fisher may refer to:

 Joe Fisher (ice hockey) (1916–2002), Canadian professional ice hockey player
 Joe Fisher (journalist) (1947–2001)
 Joseph Fisher (priest) (1655–1705), Archdeacon of Carlisle
 Joseph Fisher (Australian politician) (1834–1907), South Australian politician and businessman
 Joseph Fisher (historian), coined the phrase social Darwinism
 Josh Fisher (Joseph A. Fisher), American and Spanish computer scientist
 Joseph R. Fisher (author) (1855–1939), Northern Irish unionist newspaper editor and author
 Joseph R. Fisher (USMC) (1921–1981), Navy Cross recipient
 Joseph Fisher (Northern Ireland politician) (1901/02–1963), Northern Irish unionist
 Joseph Fisher (soldier) (1843–1903), Medal of Honor recipient
 Joseph Jefferson Fisher (1910–2000), U.S. federal judge
 Joseph L. Fisher (1914–1992), congressman from Virginia
 Joseph W. Fisher (1814–1900), American Civil War officer, politician, and judge

See also
 Joseph Fischer (disambiguation)
 Ira Joe Fisher (born 1947), television weather reporter